Robert H. Wurtz is an American neuroscientist working as a NIH Distinguished Scientist and Chief of the Section on Visuomotor Integration at the National Eye Institute. He is a member of the US National Academy of Sciences and the American Academy of Arts and Sciences. He is recognised for developing methods for studying the visual system in 'awake-behaving' primates (as opposed to those under anesthesia), a technique now widely used for the study of higher brain functions. He pioneered the study of the neuronal basis of vision and its relation with cognitive functions.

Early life and education

Robert Wurtz was born in Saint Louis, Missouri as an only child of Robert Wurtz. His father was a factory worker, a superintendent at the Mavrakos Candy Company. His mother, Alice, was a bookkeeper at the same company. When it was time for college, he wanted to go to a liberal arts college. His father persuaded him to apply to Oberlin College and he graduated from Oberlin in 1958 with a major in chemistry. Then he found an interest in experimental psychology and physiology of nervous system. He went to the University of Michigan to study psychology under James Olds. He submitted his PhD thesis in 1962, even though Olds was hesitant about the title Self-Stimulation and Escape in Response to Stimulation of the Rat Amygdala. He went on for a post-doctoral research in the Physiology Department of Washington University in St. Louis.

Professional career

In 1966, Wurtz joined the Laboratory of Neurobiology, National Institute of Mental Health, in Bethesda, Maryland. He began studies on the visual system of awake in monkeys and made groundbreaking works on neurobiology of vision and eye movements. During this time he spent a year (1975-1976) as a visiting scientist at the Physiological Laboratory at Cambridge University in England. He became the founding Chief of the Laboratory of Sensorimotor Research, National Eye Institute in 1978. In 2002, he stepped down as chief of the laboratory, but has remained as a senior investigator.

His 1969 publications became classic papers on this technique of studying the physiology of the visual system, and now used by cognitive neuroscientists around the world.

Personal life

Robert Wurtz married Sally Smith, a fellow student at Oberlin, c. 1955. They have a son William and a daughter Erica.

Award and recognition

W. Alden Spencer Award, Columbia University (1987)
Elected member of the National Academy of Sciences (1988)
Elected member of the American Academy of Arts and Sciences (1990)
President, Society for Neuroscience (1991)
1991 Golden Brain Award from Minerva Foundation
Karl Spencer Lashley Award, American Philosophical Society (1995)
Friedenwald Award, Association for Research in Vision and Ophthalmology (1996)
Distinguished Scientific Contribution Award, American Psychological Association (1997)
Institute of Medicine of the National Academy of Sciences (1997)
Dan David Prize for the Future Time Dimension: “Brain Sciences” (2004)
Ralph W. Gerard Prize of the Society for Neuroscience (2006)
Honorary Doctor of Science, Oberlin College (2009)
Grass Lecture, Society for Neuroscience (2009)
Gruber Prize in Neuroscience (2010)

References

External links
Page at NIH Neuroscience
Information at Dan David Prize
Neurotree

1936 births
21st-century American biologists
American neuroscientists
Oberlin College alumni
University of Michigan alumni
Living people
Vision scientists
Members of the National Academy of Medicine